Casalini is an Italian surname. Notable people with the surname include:

Corrado Casalini, former  Italian professional football player
Emilio Casalini (born 1941), Italian racing cyclist
Franco Casalini (born 1952), Italian basketball coach
Giancarlo Casalini (born 1934), Italian rower
Lucia Casalini Torelli (1677–1762), Italian painter, active in Bologna
Oreste Casalini (1962–2020), Italian painter and sculptor

Italian-language surnames